Telfair–Wheeler Airport  is a public use airport located three nautical miles (6 km) northeast of the central business district of McRae-Helena, a city in  Telfair County, Georgia and Wheeler County, Georgia United States. It is owned by the Telfair–Wheeler Airport Authority. This airport is included in the National Plan of Integrated Airport Systems for 2011–2015, which categorized it as a general aviation facility.

Facilities and aircraft 
Telfair–Wheeler Airport covers an area of 104 acres (42 ha) at an elevation of 203 feet (62 m) above mean sea level. It has one runway designated 3/21 with an asphalt surface measuring 5,000 by 75 feet (1,524 x 23 m).

For the 12-month period ending July 16, 2010, the airport had 4,000 general aviation aircraft operations, an average of 10 per day. At that time there were 11 aircraft based at this airport, all single-engine.

References

External links 
 MQW – Telfair–Wheeler (McRae) at Georgia DOT website
 Aerial image as of February 1993 from USGS The National Map
 
 

Airports in Georgia (U.S. state)
Transportation in Telfair County, Georgia
Transportation in Wheeler County, Georgia